The 2021 Charlotte 49ers baseball team represented the University of North Carolina at Charlotte in the sport of baseball for the 2021 college baseball season. The 49ers competed in Division I of the National Collegiate Athletic Association (NCAA) and in Conference USA East Division. They played their home games at Robert and Mariam Hayes Stadium, on the university's Charlotte campus. The team was coached by Robert Woodard, who was in his second season with the 49ers.

Preseason

C-USA media poll
The Conference USA preseason poll was released on February 11, 2021 with the 49ers predicted to finish in fifth place in the East Division.

Schedule and results

Schedule Source:
*Rankings are based on the team's current ranking in the D1Baseball poll.

Roster

Rankings

References

External links
•	Charlotte Baseball

Charlotte
Charlotte 49ers baseball seasons
Charlotte 49ers baseball
Charlotte